Man Up may refer to:

 Man Up (album), a 2008 album by The Blue Van
 Man Up (film), a 2015 film
 Man Up, a development programme fostered by Destiny Church in New Zealand
 ROH Man Up, a professional-wrestling event
 Man Up!, a 2011 sitcom
 WVBZ, a radio station licensed to Clemmons, North Carolina, United States and called 105.7 Man Up since 2015
 "Man Up", a song from the Broadway musical The Book of Mormon
 "Man Up", a song by Nikki Lane from the album All or Nothin'